Moimoi may refer to 
Moin moin, a Nigerian steamed bean pudding
Fuifui Moimoi (born 1979), Tongan rugby league footballer